Markevich, also Markevych, Markevitch, Markievich, etc. is an East Slavic surname literally meaning "son of Mark". The Polish-language versions are Markiewicz/Markiewicz. Notable people with the surname include:

Aleksandr Markevich
Boleslav Markevich, (1822 – 1884), Polish-Russian writer, essayist, journalist, and literary critic
Dimitry Markevitch (1923–2002), Ukrainian concert cellist, researcher, teacher, and musicologist
Igor Markevitch (1912 –  1983), avant-garde composer and conductor of Russian origin, naturalized French and Italian
Leonid Markevich
, designer of the ornament on the flag of Belarus
Mykola Markevych
Myron Markevych
Ostap Markevych, Ukrainian footballer, futsal player and football coach 

East Slavic-language surnames